20th Century Masters – The Millennium Collection: The Best of Kingdom Come is the first compilation album by German-American hard rock band Kingdom Come.

Track listing

Band members 
Lenny Wolf – lead vocals
Danny Stag – lead guitar
Rick Steier – rhythm guitar
Johnny B. Frank – bass
James Kottak – drums
Marco Moir – guitar (guitar solo on Should I)
Bert Meulendijk – guitar (guitar solo on You're Not the Only...I Know)
Koen van Baal – keyboards
Steve Burke – drums
Jimmy Bralower – drums

References

Kingdom Come
Kingdom Come (band) compilation albums
Polydor Records compilation albums
2003 compilation albums